James R. Foulis (October 6, 1903 – April 12, 1969) was an American professional golfer. He was the son of David Foulis and nephew of James Foulis, winner of the 1896 U.S. Open. His son David J. Foulis is a notable mathematician.

Early life
James Foulis was born in Illinois on October 6, 1903, the son of David Foulis and Janet Foulis (née Fowler).

Golf career
Foulis won several tournaments, including four Illinois PGA Championships and the 1933 St. Paul Open, two of which are considered PGA Tour wins.

First Masters Tournament
He played in the first Masters Tournament in 1934, carding rounds of 78-74-76-72=300.

Death
He died on April 12, 1969 in Wickenburg, Arizona.

Tournament wins
Note:  This list may be incomplete
1929 Illinois PGA Championship
1933 Illinois PGA Championship, St. Paul Open
1943 Illinois PGA Championship
1946 Illinois PGA Championship

Results in major championships

Note: Foulis never played in The Open Championship

NYF = tournament not yet founded
NT = no tournament
CUT = missed the half-way cut
R64, R32, R16, QF, SF = round in which player lost in PGA Championship match play
"T" indicates a tie for a place

Summary

Most consecutive cuts made – 14 (1938 U.S. Open – 1947 Masters)
Longest streak of top-10s – 1 (four times)

References

American male golfers
PGA Tour golfers
Golfers from Illinois
1903 births
1969 deaths